Moonis Raza (2 February 1925 – 19 July 1994) was an Indian academic administrator, regional planner and geographer.

Early life
He was born in 1925 into a family of landlords in the Ghazipur district of Uttar Pradesh, India. He was the older brother of Mehdi Raza, a professor of geography, and Rahi Masoom Raza, a poet, novelist, Bollywood film lyricist and screenwriter.

Career
Raza completed his higher studies from the Aligarh Muslim University before joining the same university as a lecturer and reader. In 1966 he was appointed as the head of the Department of Humanities and later as the principal of the Regional Engineering College, Srinagar.

Raza held a large number of positions at departments and commissions operated by the Government of India. He received an honorary Doctor of Humane Letters from Tufts University, United States, in 1991. He was a creator of and an original signatory to the Talloires Declaration, a ten-point action plan devised by the Association of University Leaders for a sustainable future.

Raza died of cardiac arrest in Boston, United States, on 19 July 1994.

Positions held

Chairman, Indian Council of Social Science Research
 Founder Chairman, Institute for Studies in Industrial Development
 President, National Association of Geographers of India
 Honorary Director, Center of South Asian Studies
 Vice Chancellor of Delhi University
 Founder Chairman and Rector, Jawaharlal Nehru University
 Director, National Institute of Educational Planning and Administration (NIEPA)
 President, Indian Council of Educational Planners and Administrators
 President, International Association for Ladakh Studies 
 Member, Executive Board of the Commonwealth Council of Educational Administration
 Member, Advisory Committee of the UNCRD Nagoya
 Member, Executive Board of the Commonwealth Council for Educational Administration
 Member, National Commission on Teachers
 National Lecturer in Geography 
 Professor and Founding Chairman, Center for the Study of Regional Development (SSS), Jawaharlal Nehru University
 Visiting Professor, Cornell University, United States

Publications
Raza authored, co-authored, and edited numerous books and articles, including Atlas of Tribal India, Atlas of the Child in India,Valley of Kashmir, and Education and the Future: A Vision.

References

People from Ghazipur
Aligarh Muslim University alumni
Vice-Chancellors of the University of Delhi
Indian geographers
20th-century Indian Muslims
1925 births
1994 deaths
20th-century geographers